Wiebke Siem (born 1954 in Kiel) is a German mixed media artist of German and Polish heritage, winner of the prestigious Goslarer Kaiserring in 2014 as "one of the most innovative and original artists who has never compromised in their art and whose sculptures have a tremendous aura and presence because they mix the familiar and the unfamiliar, the known and the unknown".

Career
Her work includes installations, sculptures, textiles and fashion objects which consistently reference art, fashion and design of the 20th century. In combining traditional handicrafts such as fashion and textiles with masculine-dominated ones such as fine arts and object design, Siem questions the role of the creator by insisting on the role of the woman not just as maker but also as author. Her works, often sewed or carved, are intensively labour-based and often deal with themes of domesticity and the elaborate function which women perform in the social sphere.

The majority of Siem's early work made use of the preceding German artistic generation as source material by consistently quoting and borrowing aesthetic elements albeit in a satirizing and ironic manner. Over the course of her career, Siem has also drawn from a wide variety of ethnographic sources including puppets, traditional furniture design, and European folk costumes as well as elements of anthropology and sociology The artist lives and works in Berlin.

Education 
From 1979 to 1984, Siem studied at the University of Fine Arts in Hamburg. Siem herself was appointed Visiting Professor from 2000-2001 and Professor of Sculpture from 2002 to 2008. During this time Siem was also a member of the Deutscher Künstlerbund.

Work 
Siem developed her first artworks in the form of dresses, murals and hats during and after her studies in Hamburg between 1983 and 1988. In these works, Siem makes use of 'traditional' female domains such as sewing and fashion to satirize and critically evaluate the influences of the influential artistic generation which preceded her. For example, her 'clothes-works' of the early 1980s are an answer to the textile works of the German artist Franz Erhard Walther by means of the designation "objects for use", a term which Walther himself used in describing some of his wearable fabric sculptures. Using eye-catching patterns partly offset on the surface of the dress, as if the parts had been carelessly sewn together, Siem creates a sense of formal alienation which visually lifts clothes designed for everyday use. Similarly, murals which were created by Siem in the same period reference the large-scale wall paintings by the German artist Blinky Palermo. Instead of composing a monochrome painting as Palermo would have done, Siem paints a marble imitation stone, as one would in a theater set. These wall works were placed in the public space such staircases, office halls, or cafés and remained there without being marked as a work of art, in some cases for years. Siem's 'hat works', on the other hand, are wearable objects which are not discernable as artworks apart from their uniqueness. In fact, Siem's textile works were only exhibited as art objects some years later, in the gallery Chantal Crousel in Paris in 1995.

The Four Workgroups 
From 1989 to 1997, Siem created four groups of works which occupy a central place in her oeuvre. The first group of works, created from 1989 to 1993, is composed of dresses, hats, bags, and shoes. As in her previous works, the artist's objects blur the line between art and fashion since it is both possible to wear them and consider them under objective aesthetic terms. As potential prototypes, they are normally exhibited in the style of a merchandise presentation one would find in a fashion store.

The objects of the second group of works (1991-1994) are more ambivalent. The terms used to describe the objects - clothes, hairstyles, shawls, trolleys - suggests fashion or lifestyle objects, but the group of works itself resembles the collection of a cultural-historical museum. The 'clothes' are hard, like armor, and the 'hairstyles' (made of stone) are not actually possible to wear or even carry unassisted. The 'trolleys' are heavy wooden models similar to ones that might be found in an agricultural museum. The 'shawls' are thick tapestries made of felt. Hence the understanding of the female role is subverted and rehashed in the form of 'superficial' feminine objects ever which present themselves as increasingly absurd.

Similarly, the third group of works (1993-1997) is also reminiscent of a museum collection. Untitled (6 Masks) is made up of six large furry outfits resembling traditional costumes of folk characters from the Alpine regions of Germany, Switzerland, and Austria. In the group Untitled (7 Masks) the artist has reproduced her own face in seven different facial expressions in reference to the 18th century German-Austrian sculptor Franz Xaver Messerschmidt. The group Untitled (42 Stones) ironically performs the formal canon of modernist sculptures in papier-mâché (visually referencing figures such as Hans Arp and Henry Moore) in 42 individual examples.

The fourth group of works (1995-1997) consists of an installation which creates the appearance of a huge room. A group of life-size dolls, figurines and wooden objects appear comically small, like toys, in the center of an oversize carpet. The dolls reference classical European doll forms as well as the sculptures and theater costumes of the Dadaist Oskar Schlemmer.

Rustic Furniture ("Bauernmöbel") 
Wiebke Siem developed the series 'Rustic Furniture' during her first residency in the UK. All objects are 1:1 copies of existing German farm furniture of the 18th and 19th centuries in various private and public European collections. The objects create a sense of alienation due to the fact that the replica furniture has been painted brand new. They seem strange to the viewer, despite being lifted from a familiar cultural-historical background. This commentary on political and sociological framework raises the question of what can be considered strictly 'foreign' within the public sphere and what can be considered culturally one's own.

Costume Masks ("Maskenkostüme") 
The mask costumes (2000/2001), mostly created during Siem's second stay in England, refer to objects of non-European cultures in preserved European museum collections, such as mask costumes of the African or the Pacific region. The carved masks, however, also make clear references to European modernism. (Modigliani, Schlemmer). Siem points out that the art of non-European space is a resource of European modernity.

The Counterfeiter ("Die Fälscherin") 
Between 2005 and 2009, Siem worked on a group of larger installations that were shown in 2009 at the Neues Museum Nürnberg under the exhibition title Die Fälscherin. In pre-and post-war room furnishings and furniture, large fabric sculptures are placed as actors in surreal domestic scenes. Anxiety, vision and comedy are central elements of the main installation, which consists of an "Africa collection" made up of household items obsessively occupying the entire room.

Hot Skillet Mama 
With the sculptures that have been created since 2010, Wiebke Siem freed her practice from the intricately crafted sculptures that have characterized her work for decades. She began to assemble her sculptures from simple household objects before working on them to give them a uniform surface. As disembodied sculptures they are not unlike skeletons and hang like puppets from the ceiling. As with many of Siem's works, the sculptures also express themes of alienation - the transformation of something familiar into something foreign.

In the studio installation Der Traum der Dinge - The Dream of  Things (at the K20 – Collection Nordrhein-Westfalen in Düsseldorf) Siem invited the visitors to assemble and hang household appliances into new figures, effectively creating new artwork out of common domestic tools by means of audience participation.

Bursaries and awards 
 2014 Goslarer Kaiserring
 2013 Scholarship of the Internationalen Kunstlerhauses Villa Concordia, Bamberg
 2011 Publication Grant, Kunstfonds Foundation, Bonn
 2002 Edwin Scharff Prize, Hamburg
 2001/2002 Scholarship of the Berliner Senatsverwaltung for Culture at Delfina Studio Trust, London
 1999/2000 Sculpture Fellowship, The Henry Moore Foundation, Bristol, England
 1996/1997 Residency, Künstlerhaus Bethanien, Berlin
 1995/1996 Scholarship, Cité internationale des arts, Paris
 1994 Scholarship for visual art, Stiftung Kunstfonds Bonn
 1994 Publication grant, Alfried Krupp von Bohlen and Halbach Foundation
 1991 Scholarship, Akademie Schloss Solitude, Stuttgart
 1990 Visual arts grant, Kulturbehörde Hamburg

Solo exhibitions 
2016

 K20 - Kunstsammlung Nordrhein-Westfalen (im Lanir), Wiebke Siem – Der Traum der Dinge

2014

 Wilhelm Lehmbruck Museum, Duisburg

2013

 Johnen Galerie, Berlin.
 Geister, Installation in the stairhous of the Kunsthalle within the framework of the exhibition Gute Gesellschaft, Kunsthalle zu Kiel

2011

 Wiebke Siem im Atelier Karin Sander, Studio Karin Sander, Berlin

2009

 Die Fälscherin, Neues Museum in Nürnberg, Nuremberg
 Werkgruppe, Ständige Sammlung, Neues Museum in Nürnberg, Nuremberg

2007

 Niema tego złego coby na dobry nie wyzło, Johnen Galerie, Berlin

2004/05

 Maskenkostüme, Galerie der Moderne, Kunsthalle Hamburg

2002

 Galerie Lindig in Paludetto, Nuremberg
 2. Werkgruppe, Ständige Sammlung, Neues Museum in Nürnberg, Nuremberg
 Frith Street Gallery, London (mit Massimo Bartolini)

2001

 Collection, The Henry Moore Institute, Leeds, England

2000

 Spike Island, Bristol, England
 Galerie Johnen & Schöttle, Cologne
 Exhibition for the Künstlerhaus Bethanien, Art Forum, Berlin

1997

 Castello di Rivara, Torino, Italy
Kunsthalle Bern, Switzerland
 Künstlerhaus Bethanien, Berlin

1996

 Duchamps Urenkel, Bonner Kunstverein, Bonn
 Galerie Johnen & Schöttle, Cologne

1995

 Gallery Chantal Crousel, Paris

1994

 Portikus, Frankfurt am Main
 Galerie Johnen & Schöttle, Cologne

1993

 Museum Robert Walser, Hotel Krone, Gais, Switzerland
 Galerie Rüdiger Schöttle, Paris
 Galerie Johnen & Schöttle, Cologne
 Galerie Rüdiger Schöttle, Munich

1991

Akademie Schloss Solitude, Stuttgart
 Kunstraum Neue Kunst, Hannover

1990

 Westwerk, Hamburg

Group exhibitions 
2017
  Sculptures by Wiebke Siem and Ann Veronica Janssens, Galerie Esther Schipper, Berlin
2013

 Just what is it that makes today's homes so different so appealing, New Arts Centre, Salisbury
 Weltreise, Kunst aus Deutschland unterwegs, Werke aus dem Kunstbestand des Ifa1949 – heute, ZKM, Museum für Moderne Kunst, Karlsruhe
 Regionalismus Salzburger Kunstverein, Salzburg

2011

 Säen und Jäten, Cobra Museum, Netherlands
 Künstlersammler: Mona Hatoum, Arturo Herrera, Karin Sander, Kunsthalle Koidl, Berlin

2010

 Konversationsstücke Akt II, Johnen Galerie, Berlin

2009

 Säen und Jäten, Städtische Galerie Ravensburg, Städtische Galerie Wolfsburg
 Zeigen, Eine Audiotour durch Berlin von Karin Sander, Temporäre Kunsthalle Berlin

2008

 Auf der Erbse, Galerie der Stadt Sindelfingen
 We are Stardust we are golden, Galerie Johnen + Schöttle, Cologne

2001

 Un-wearable Fashion as Sculpture, Museum für Angewandte Kunst, Cologne
 Through the Looking Glass, Galerie M+R. Fricke, Berlin
 Blondies and Brownies, Aktionsforum Praterinsel, Munich

2000

 Solitude im Museum, Staatsgalerie Stuttgart, Musee d`Art Moderne de Saint Etienne, France
 Anyone could be anyone else in most ways, Galerie Brigitte Trotha, Frankfurt am Main

1999

 Kunstmuseum Wolfsburg, Germany
 Triennale der Kleinplastik, Forum der Südwest LB, Stuttgart
 Global Fun, Museum Schloss Morsbroich, Leverkusen
 Zoom, a view on German contemporary Art, Villa Merkel, Esslingen, Städtisches Museum Abteiberg, Mönchengladbach
 Kunsthalle Kiel

1998

 The House in the Woods, Center for Contemporary Arts, Glasgow, Scotland
 Dundee Contemporary Arts, Scotland
 Ormeau Baths Gallery, Belfast, Northern Ireland
 Kunst und Papier auf dem Laufsteg, Fashionshow, Deutsche Guggenheim, Berlin
 Addressing the Century, 100 Years of Art and Fashion, Hayward Gallery, London

1997

 Art/Fashion, Guggenheim Museum Soho, New York

1996

 Bodyscape, Barbara Gross Galerie, Munich
 Private View, The Bowes Museum, Barnard Castle, England
 Propositions, Musee Departemental de Rochechouard, France
 Linien und Zeichen, Künstlerhaus Bethanien, Berlin
 Il tempo e la Moda, Biennale di Firenze, Italy

1995

 Leiblicher Logos, Staatsgalerie Stuttgart, Altes Museum, Berlin, Castello di Rivoli, Torino, Italy and other international locations
 Giovani Artisti Tedesci, Castello di Rivara, Torino, Italy
 Zimmerdenkmäler, Bochum
 Aperto 95, Le Nouveau Musee Villeurbanne, Lyon, France

1994

 Suture – Phantasmen der Vollkommenheit, Salzburger Kunstverein, Salzburg
 Life is too much, Galerie des Archives, Paris
 Villa Pams – Le Jardin des Senteurs, Collioure, France
 Bad zur Sonne – 100 Umkleidekabinen, Steirischer Herbst, Graz, Austria
 Trans, Galerie Chantal Crousel, Paris
 Expose, Institut für Auslandsbeziehungen, Stuttgart

1992

 Kunstraum neue Kunst, Hannover
 Le Témoin Oculiste, Centre Corégraphique Nationale de Franche-Comté, Belfort, France
 Qui, Quoi, Ou?, Un regard sur l'Art en Allemagne 1992, Museé d'Art Moderne de la Ville de Paris
 Just what is it, that makes today's home so different, so appealing, Galerie Jennifer Flay, Paris
 Chambre 763, Hotel Carlton Palace, Paris

1991

 Hamburger Arbeitsstipendien, Halle K3, Hamburg
 Rund um die Kuppel, Württembergischer Kunstverein, Stuttgart

1990

 Galerie Jürgen Becker, Hamburg

Selected sculptures in public collections 

 Hamburger Kunsthalle
 Staatsgalerie Stuttgart
 Neues Museum Nürnberg
 Fonds National, Frankreich
 FRAC Franche-Comté, Frankreich
 FRAC Dole, Frankreich
 FRAC d´Alsace, Selestat
 Landesbank Baden-Württemberg, Stuttgart
 IFA Collection, Stuttgart
 Deutsche Bank Collection, Frankfurt/Main
 Rudolf Bossi Collection, Zürich
 Lother Schirmer Collection, München

Publications 
1991

 Wiebke Siem: Kleider, Hüte, Taschen, Schuhe, Texts from Wiebke Siem and Jean Paul; Catalogue to the exhibition in Schloss Solitude. Hrsg.: Jean-Baptiste Joly, Akademie Schloss Solitude, Stuttgart, 1991

1994

 Wiebke Siem: Kleider, Frisuren, Tücher, Wagen, Texts from Wiebke Siem and Adelbert von Chamisso; Catalogue to the exhibition in Portikus. Hrsg.: Kasper König, Portikus, Frankfurt am Main, 1994

1996

 Wiebke Siem, Text from Wiebke Siem and Annelie Pohlen; Brochure to the exhibition. Hrsg.: Bonner Kunstverein 1996.

1997

 Wiebke Siem – Kunsthalle Bern, Texts from Wiebke Siem and Ulrich Loock; Catalogue to the exhibition. Hrsg.: Kunsthalle Bern, Schweiz, 1997
 Turmzimmer, Text from Peter Herbstreuth; Brochure to exhibition in Künstlerhaus Bethanien, Berlin, 1997
 Wiebke Siem: Kunsthalle Bern, Castello di Rivara, Wiebke Siem, 1997, 

2000

 Juliana Engberg and Wiebke Siem: A new Project by Wiebke Siem, Text from Kay Campbell; Brochure to the exhibition in Spike Island. Hrsg.: Spike Island, Bristol, England, 2000

2007

 Wiebke Siem: Niema tego zlego coby na dobre nie wyszlo, Text von Jens Asthoff; Catalogue to the exhibition. Hrsg.: Johnen Galerie, Berlin 2007

2013

 Wiebke Siem: Arbeiten 1983–2013. Hrsg.: Melitta Kliege and Angelika Nollert, Verlag für Moderne Kunst Nürnberg, 2013
 Anna, Susanne, Markus Heinzelmann, and Oliver Zybok. Untragbar: Mode Als Skulptur. Köln: Siemens Kulturprigramm, Museum Für Angewandte Kunst, 2001.

2014

 Of Bits: Pieces and the Whole, Works from 1999 to 2014. Herzogenrath, Wulf, Penelope Curtis, Michael Scuffil, and Wiebke Siem Goslar: Mönchehaus-Museum, 2014.

2015

 Wiebke Siem. Söke Dinkla, Bettina Ruhrberg, and Michael Krajewski. Duisburg: Lehmbruck Museum, 2015.

External links 

 Artist's Biography, Esther Schipper Gallery Berlin 
Review, Wiebke Siem, Johnen Gallery, Frieze Magazine

References 

German installation artists
German women artists
German fashion designers
German sculptors
German women sculptors
German contemporary artists
Living people
Textile artists
1954 births
Women textile artists
German textile artists
German women fashion designers